Gran Hotel Montesol Ibiza is a historic hotel in Ibiza Town, Ibiza. It is officially listed as a Bien de Interés Cultural by the Spanish Ministry of Culture.

It is characterised by its white and yellow color. The hotel, established in 1933, is the first ever hotel established on Ibiza. During the Spanish Civil War in 1936 and until the end of World War II in 1945, it was used by the army.
The establishment closed for renovations at the end of 2014. The hotel joined Hilton's Curio Collection in 2016 and left in 2020.

References

External links
Gran Hotel Montesol Ibiza official website

Hotels in Ibiza
Hotels established in 1933
Hotel buildings completed in 1933